Jamie Storr (born December 28, 1975) is a Canadian former professional ice hockey goaltender. He played in the National Hockey League with the Los Angeles Kings and Carolina Hurricanes between 1995 and 2004.

Playing career
Storr was the first goalie selected in the 1991 OHL Entry Draft and played major junior with the Owen Sound Platers and the Windsor Spitfires of the Ontario Hockey League (OHL). In the 1994 NHL Entry Draft, Storr was drafted 7th overall by the Los Angeles Kings. He remained in the OHL for one more season before turning pro in 1994–95.

Storr spent the majority of his first three seasons in the Kings' minor league system with the Phoenix Roadrunners and Long Beach Ice Dogs of the International Hockey League (IHL). In his rookie season, he was given the opportunity to live with teammate Wayne Gretzky and his family in Beverly Hills, CA. Storr was named to the NHL All-Rookie Team twice, in 1997–98 and 1998–99. Although he first appeared with the Kings in 1994–95, Storr did not play the minimum number of games in one season (25) to not be considered a rookie until after 1998–99, therefore making him eligible for the honour multiple times. His All-Rookie Team appearance in 1997-98 made him the only NHL player to be named to the All-Rookie Team while playing in fewer than 20 games in that season.

Storr remained with the Kings until the 2003–04 season, when he joined the Carolina Hurricanes. He was not, however, able to stick with the club and played in the minor leagues for the next three seasons. In 2006, Storr signed with the German DEG Metro Stars and went overseas to play in the Deutsche Eishockey Liga (DEL). Storr retired after three years with DEG Metro Stars on 13 May 2009. In 2010 it was announced that Storr would be an emergency backup with DEG Metro Stars; however, he would stay in North America unless needed. He finally didn't have to play.

International play
Storr represented Team Canada extensively during his junior career, winning gold at the U-17, U-18 and U-20 levels. At the 1994 and 1995 World Junior Championships in the Czech Republic and Sweden, Storr won back-to-back gold medals with Canada, going undefeated in tournament play.

Storr was one of 2 players to ever win 5 gold medals representing Team Canada before he played his first NHL game. U-17(91), U-18(92), two world Juniors (94) and (95) as well as world championship (94). The only other player to do so was Paul Kariya.

In 1994, he won the World Junior Championships Best Goaltender award and was also named to Team Canada's senior team for the World Championships, where he captured another gold medal, despite not appearing in a game.

Awards
OHL
 Drafted 1st goalie overall to the Owen Sound Platers at the 1991 OHL Draft, going 2nd pick in the second round.
 Named to the All-Rookie Team in 1992.
 Named to the First All-Star Team in 1994.
 Named OHL Goalie of Year in 1994.
NHL
 Drafted 7th overall by the Los Angeles Kings at the 1994 NHL Entry Draft, the first goalie
 Named to the All-Rookie Team in 1998 and 1999.

DEL
 Won Best Goaltender in 2007.

International
 Won gold medal at the IIHF Under-17 Tournament in 1992.
 Won gold medal at the IIHF Under-18 Phoenix Cup in 1993.
 Won Top Goaltender Award at the IIHF Phoenix Cup in 1993.
 Won gold medal at the World Junior Championships in 1994.
 Won gold medal at the World Junior Championships in 1995.
 Won Top Goaltender Award at the World Junior Championships in 1994.
 Won a gold medal at the World Championships in 1994.

Off the ice
Storr has been a popular guest on TSN sports show Off The Record with Michael Landsberg. He is also a renowned goaltending coach and mentor to many young Southern California goalies. He runs the Jamie Storr Goalie School at the Toyota Sports Center in El Segundo where they have two week-long camps every July along with a camp every Christmas; they also host a weekend camp in May each year. Storr has worked goalies from all different levels and leagues including the DEL training Jochen Reimer, a former teammate of the DEG Metro Stars. Storr also opened up a hockey training center inside the TSC with friend and old teammate Jason Blake that includes a skating treadmill and shooting lane for players and goalies to train in a one of a kind training center that overlooks the ice the LA Kings train on. He is a father of three children living with his family in El Segundo, California. He works for the Los Angeles Kings with Kings alumni.

During Storr's playing career, he wore a goalie mask that featured Japanese dragons to honor his late mother, who is Japanese.

Career statistics

Regular season and playoffs

International

References

External links
 

1975 births
Living people
Canadian expatriate ice hockey players in Germany
Canadian ice hockey goaltenders
Canadian sportspeople of Japanese descent
Carolina Hurricanes players
DEG Metro Stars players
Ice hockey people from Ontario
Los Angeles Kings draft picks
Los Angeles Kings players
National Hockey League first-round draft picks
Owen Sound Platers players
Philadelphia Phantoms players
Phoenix Roadrunners (IHL) players
Sportspeople from Brampton
Windsor Spitfires players